Yaochidao (瑤池道 "Way of the Mother-of-Pearl Lake"), also known by the name of its corporate form the Holy Church of the Mother-of-Pearl Lake, Taiwan Yauchi Holy Church (台灣瑤池聖教會) or by the older name of Cihuitang (慈惠堂 "Church of the Loving Favour"), is a Chinese folk religious sect related to the Xiantiandao lineage, with a strong following in Taiwan and active as an underground church in the People's Republic of China, where it is theoretically a proscribed sect.

It existed before the 20th century and it is focused on the worship of Xiwangmu (the "Queen Mother of the West").

Practices

Members of Yaochidao wear blue uniforms, and perform a variety of ritual and practices including divination of inspired scriptures, chanting of scriptures, exercises of body cultivation, gods' mediumship and other forms of charismatic religious praxis.

See also 
 Chinese salvationist religions
 Chinese folk religion

References

External links
Yaochi Holy Church
Sung Shan Cihuitang

Sources
 

Chinese salvationist religions